Carl Johan Adlercreutz (27 April 1757 – 21 August 1815) was a Swedish (Finnish) general and statesman, born in Borgå, Finland on family estates. Entering the Swedish army aged 13 in the Finnish Light Cavalry Brigade, he was present when Gustav III launched his coup-d’etat. He studied military theory in Stockholm.

In 1777 he joined the Savolax Brigade protecting the Finnish border against Russian aggression. Adlercreutz first saw action in the 1788-1790 Russo-Swedish War, where he distinguished himself. He was promoted Major in 1791 and Squadron Commander 1792. During the Anjala mutiny he remained faithful to the King, standing against the war with Russia, then took part in the trials against the conspirators. He was thereafter appointed the commanding officer of the Nyland Dragoons, holding this post until 1804, when he was made Ofverste (Colonel-in-Chief) of the newly raised Adlercreutz Regiment.

Finnish War of 1808
At the opening of the Finnish war Adlercreutz was appointed Ofverste commanding the 2nd brigade under Klercker. He replaced Gustaf Löwenhielm as Wilhelm Mauritz Klingspor’s Chief of Staff on 14 April. Adlercreutz distinguished himself in action at Siikajoki, 18 April, and at Revolax, 27th. On 24 June he forced the Russians from Nykarleby. As CO of the Northern 'Army' he drove Raevsky from Lappo in a brilliant action on 14 July, then defeated the Russians again at Alavo in August. At the end of that month he was appointed to command the 'Finnish' Division under Klingspor. Forced to retreat due to the Swedish victories not being exploited, he was severely defeated by Nikolay Kamensky at the Battle of Oravais 14 September, which obliged him to abandon Finland.

As a consequence of the loss of Finland his estates were confiscated.

Coup d'etat and subsequent career

Adlercreutz returned to Stockholm to take charge of a military junta ruling the country in place of the insane King Gustav IV after the Coup of 1809. With Georg Adlersparre, on 13 March 1809 at the head of the Junta he arrested the King and seized power. Adlercreutz proposed that he himself should be made king, but Gustav IV's uncle, Charles XIII was made king and the French Marshal Jean Baptiste Bernadotte was chosen instead as Crown Prince and heir to the throne. Later the two generals quarreled, and Adlersparre was disgraced, while Adlercreutz remained in favor, elected Count and took a seat in the Government.

In 1813 Adlercreutz was made General and appointed Chief of Staff to Curt von Stedingk under the Crown Prince's Swedish Army of the North in Germany 1813. He served at the Battle of Leipzig 16–19 October, and was made a Commander of the Austrian Order of Maria Theresa, 88/144 promotion 1813-14.

Personal life
In 1792, Adlercreutz married Baroness Henrietta Amalia Stackelberg (1771–1796), daughter of Lieutenant General Bernt Fredrik Johan Stackelberg and Virginia Sofia Adlerberg. He married again in 1798 to Margareta von Engeström, daughter of bergsrådet Gustaf von Engeström and Abela Charlotta Lagerbring. He was the father of Fredrik Adlercreutz and uncle of Axel Gustav Adlercreutz.

References

Further reading 

 
 

1757 births
1815 deaths
People from Porvoo
Swedish generals
Swedish nobility
Swedish military personnel of the Finnish War
Recipients of the Order of St. George of the Second Degree
Swedish military commanders of the Napoleonic Wars
Carl Johan